Mealasbhal (574 m) is the highest peak on the Isle of Lewis in the Outer Hebrides of Scotland.

It is the highest of the Uig hills on the west coast of the island. It is usually climbed from the small village of Brenish where it provides excellent views from its summit. Looking westwards out to the North Atlantic the Flannan Isles and further offshore to St Kilda, Scotland.

The hill rises up directly from the heather Machair on the Brenish side and is primarily heather covered until the approach to the summit which is rocky and strewn with boulders.  There are various lochs strewn around the base and the Brenish river runs from one directly through the village to the bay.

References

Mountains and hills of the Outer Hebrides
Marilyns of Scotland
Landforms of the Outer Hebrides
Isle of Lewis